Qanli (also Romanized as Qānlī; also known as Kanlu, Khānlū, Qaflu, and Qānlū) is a village in Howmeh Rural District, in the Central District of Khodabandeh County, Zanjan Province, Iran. At the 2006 census, its population was 324, in 58 families.

References 

Populated places in Khodabandeh County